Python (theatrically released in the Philippines as Anaconda 2000) is a 2000 made-for-TV comedy horror film directed by Richard Clabaugh. The film features several cult favorite actors, including William Zabka of The Karate Kid fame, Wil Wheaton, Casper Van Dien, Jenny McCarthy, Keith Coogan, Robert Englund, Dana Barron, David Bowe, and Sean Whalen.

The film concerns a genetically engineered snake, a python, that escapes and unleashes itself on a small town. It was filmed in Los Angeles and Malibu, California.

Python was followed by three sequels: Pythons 2 (2002), New Alcatraz (also known as Boa) and Boa vs. Python (2004), all of which are also made-for-TV films.

Plot
A plane crashes near a town called Ruby after its cargo escapes. The cargo survives the crash and attacks Ruby citizens, starting with a couple named Lisa and Roberta, camping in the woods.

At a swimming hole the next day, John, his girlfriend Kristin, his best friend Tommy, and Tommy's girlfriend Theresa find Lisa's pet Burmese python. Deputy Greg arrives, mentioning that Lisa is missing, and takes the snake. Lisa's body is found, appearing to have been corroded by acids. Greg suspects John, since he works at a plant that uses acids.

Scientist Anton Rudolph meets with NSA Special Agent Parker. The cargo is an abnormally large reticulated python genetically engineered in Southeast Asia, blending several species. In the words of Dr. Rudolph, it is, "a perfect killing machine. A 129-foot all-terrain vehicle, capable of speeds exceeding 50 miles an hour, with skin that can deflect an antitank round, enhanced night vision, and a voracious appetite for human flesh". The NSA team plans an assault against the snake.

The snake kills a real estate agent and the agent's client, leaving behind the client and Roberta's bodies. John arrives as the snake leaves, furthering suspicion against him. The sheriff shuts down his brother Brian's plant. When the body of the real estate agent is found with the same acid damage, the sheriff orders John arrested.

The NSA team and Anton arrive, telling the sheriff a story about a psychotic rogue operative committing the murders. He does not believe them, but frees John. Kristin, Tommy, Theresa, and he plan to go on a trip the next morning.

The NSA set up base at a water treatment center. They use radar to find where the snake is likely to be, then have the police set up a perimeter to keep people out of the zone. Believing the snake to be sleeping, the team wastes most of its ammunition on the snake's shed skin. Agent Parker realizes the snake used its skin as a decoy. The snake kills the team, the sole survivor being Anton who keeps himself standing motionless in front of the creature.

Theresa's morning shower is interrupted by the snake. Though she escapes, the snake eats Tommy. Theresa drives away, but the snake follows. It gets in front of her and disables the truck. Theresa hides in a crevice.

When Tommy and Theresa do not arrive, John and Kristin go looking for them, finding the wrecked truck. Theresa tries warning them as the snake approaches, but they cannot hear her. John and Kristin escape using Tommy and Theresa's bikes from the truck. They make it to the water treatment center, where Theresa joins them, and find Anton in shock. The group realizes that they must do something about the snake or it will get to the town. They call Greg on the radio and fill him in on a plan they have devised.

They lure the snake into the water treatment plant by having it chase John through a shaft, while they set a bomb near the entrance. Kristin drops a line down another shaft for John to escape. They pull John out and the python is unable to climb up the shaft. Trapped in the tunnel, the python returns to the doorway entrance. The group returns to the entrance to trigger the bomb, but it does not detonate. Anton runs back in to reset it. Anton detonates the charges while confronted by the snake, sacrificing himself. While the other four are celebrating their success, the python emerges unscathed.

The group flees in Greg's police car, planning to penetrate the snake's hide by luring the snake into a vat of acid at John's plating plant. They are able to push the snake's underbelly into one of the vats, causing the snake to be killed by the acid.

Six months later, Greg has been accepted into Quantico to be an FBI agent, the plant has been reopened as a bar/bike shop where the snake's skin is used as a sales tool, and John finds out that Kristin and he are soon to be parents.

Cast
Frayne Rosanoff as John Cooper
Robert Englund as Dr. Anton Rudolph
Casper Van Dien as NSA Special Agent Bart Parker
William Zabka as Deputy Greg Larston
Dana Barron as Kristin
Sara Mornell as Theresa
Wil Wheaton as Tommy
Jenny McCarthy as Francesca Garibaldi
Chris Owens as Brian Cooper
Sean Whalen as Deputy Lewis Ross
Gary Grubbs as Sheriff Griffin Wade
Theo Pagones as Dootsen
Scott Williamson as Kenny Summers
David Bowe as Boone
Keith Coogan as Lenny
John Franklin as Floyd Fuller
LoriDawn Messuri as Lisa Johnson
Kathleen Randazzo as Roberta Keeler
Ed Lauter as Pilot
Frank Welker as The Python (voice)

Reception
Python was originally broadcast in the United States on August 9, 2000. In the Philippines, the film was theatrically released as Anaconda 2000 on October 25, 2000, connecting it to the unrelated 1997 film Anaconda.

Python received mixed reviews. Critics praised the ensemble cast, but criticized the special effects and plot. Others thought that it was an above-average television film with good special effects.

Sequels
Python had three sequels: 
New Alcatraz (2002, also known as Boa) is about a giant prehistoric boa constrictor that is accidentally unleashed into a state-of-the-art prison in Antarctica, during a mining operation. The prison staff, the inmates, and two paleontologists must band together to escape the prison or become the serpent's prey. The film was considered a critical failure. 
Pythons 2 (2002) has two carnivorous mutant pythons that terrorize a Russian research complex and military base; the Russians and the Americans must work together to destroy the creatures and save themselves.
Boa vs. Python (2004), directed by David Flores, is a crossover between Python and Boa.

See also
List of killer snake films

References

External links

Director Richard Clabaugh's talks about Python

2000 films
2000s English-language films
2000 television films
2000 horror films
American horror television films
American natural horror films
Films about snakes
Syfy original films
2000s American films